Emma Goldrick was the pseudonym used by the married writing team formed by Emma Elizabeth Jean Sutcliffe (born February 7, 1923 in Puerto Rico - died November 20, 2008) and Robert N. Goldrick (born March 22, 1919 in Massachusetts, United States - died January 22, 1996). Under this name they wrote 41 romance novels published by Mills & Boon between 1983 and 1996. After Robert's death, Emma wrote her last book, "The Ninety-Day Wife", in his memory.

Bibliography

Single novels
And Blow Your House Down (1983)
Miss Mary's Husband (1985)
Ice Lady (1985)
Night Bells Blooming (1985)
The Trouble With Bridges (1985)
Rent-a-bride Ltd. (1985)
Daughter of the Sea (1985)
Thunder Over Eden (1985)
The Over-Mountain Man (1985)
Hidden Treasures (1986)
If Love be Blind (1987)
King of the Hill (1987)
Temporary Paragon (1987)
Madeleine's Marriage (1988)
My Brother's Keeper (1988)
To Tame a Tycoon (1988)
Pilgrim's Promise (1988)
A Heart As Big As Texas (1989)
The Girl He Left Behind (1990)
Love Is in the Cards (1990)
Silence Speaks for Love (1990)
Mississippi Miss (1990)
Summer Storms (1991)
Doubly Delicious (1991)
Smuggler's Love (1991)
Loveable Katie Lovewell (1991)
The Widow's Mite (1992)
Spirit of Love (1992)
Baby Makes Three (1993)
The Unmarried Bride (1993)
The Balleymore Bride (1994)
The Ninety-Day Wife (1997)

Latimore Saga
The Road (1984)
Tempered by Fire (1986)
The Latimore Bride (1988)
Faith, Hope and Marriage (1995)
Bringing Up Babies (1996)

First Class Series Multi-Author
A Touch of Forgiveness (1990)

Kids & Kisses Series Multi-Author
Leonie's Luck (1994)
Faith, Hope and Marriage (1995)

Babies & Bachelors USA Series Multi-Author
The Baby Caper (1995)

Holding Out for a Hero Series Multi-Author
Husband Material (1996)
Bringing Up Babies (1996)

Baby Boom Series Multi-Author
Bringing Up Babies (1996)

Omnibus in collaboration
Blind to Love (1988) (with Connie Bennett and Rebecca Winters)
Sunsational (1991) (with Emma Darcy, Penny Jordan and Carole Mortimer)
Just Add Children: Perfect Solution, Doubly Delicious (1995) (with Catherine George)
The Parent Trap (1997) (with Helen Brooks)
Love and Marriage (1999) (with Betty Neels)
Blind Passions (1999) (with Miranda Lee and Rebecca Winters)
A Tender Christmas (2000) (with Liz Fielding and Leigh Michaels)

External links
Emma Goldrick's Webpage in Fantastic Fiction's Website

20th-century American novelists
American romantic fiction writers
People from New Bedford, Massachusetts